Pho Nimit BTS station is a BTS skytrain station, on the Silom Line in Khwaeng Bukkhalo, Thon Buri District, Bangkok, Thailand. The station is located on Ratchaphruek Road. It is surrounded by residences, small shops and office towers.

The station opened on 12 January 2013.

See also
 Bangkok Skytrain

References

BTS Skytrain stations
Railway stations opened in 2013
2013 establishments in Thailand